Charlie Ellix (18 October 1941 – 18 March 2002) was an English professional darts player.

Career
Ellix reached the final in the 1976 Indoor League, losing to Leighton Rees. He then reached the quarter finals of the 1977 Winmau World Masters, losing to eventual winner Eric Bristow. Ellix reached another final in the 1978 Denmark Open where he lost to John Lowe and then reached the quarter final in the 1978 World Masters, losing to Tony Sontag.

Ellix played in the 1979 BDO World Darts Championship, losing in the first round to Doug McCarthy. He returned to Jollees two years later for the 1981 BDO World Darts Championship, again losing in the first round to Dave Whitcombe.

On 29 April 1974 he threw the then fastest (in numbers of darts thrown) 3,001 when he achieved this score with only 79 darts, an average of 37.98 per dart.

Ellix died on 18 March 2002.

World Championships results

BDO
 1979: Last 24 (lost to Doug McCarthy 1–2) (sets)
 1981: Last 32 (lost to Dave Whitcombe 0–2)

References

External links
Profile and stats on Darts Database

English darts players
1941 births
2002 deaths
People from Billingham
British Darts Organisation players
Sportspeople from County Durham